Nora Noel Jill Bennett (24 December 1931 – 4 October 1990) was a British actress, and the fourth wife of playwright John Osborne.

Early life
Bennett was born in Penang, the Straits Settlements, to British parents, educated at Prior's Field School, an independent girls boarding school in Godalming, and trained at RADA. She made her West End debut in Now Barabbas in March 1947, was a company member during the 1949 season at the Shakespeare Memorial Theatre in Stratford upon Avon, and made her first film, The Long Dark Hall with Rex Harrison, in 1950.

Career
Bennett made many appearances in British films including Lust for Life (1956), The Criminal (1960), The Nanny (1965), The Skull (1965), Inadmissible Evidence (1968), The Charge of the Light Brigade (1968), Julius Caesar (1970), I Want What I Want (1972), Mister Quilp (1975), Full Circle (1977) and Britannia Hospital (1982). She also appeared in the Bond film For Your Eyes Only (1981), Lady Jane (1986) and Hawks (1988). Her final film performance was in The Sheltering Sky (1990).

She made forays into television, such as roles in Play for Today (Country, 1981), with Wendy Hiller, and as the colourful Lady Grace Fanner in John Mortimer's adaptation of his own novel, Paradise Postponed (1985). In 1984 she co-wrote and starred in the sitcom Poor Little Rich Girls alongside Maria Aitken. Among several roles, Osborne wrote the character of Annie in his play The Hotel in Amsterdam (1968) for her. But Bennett's busy schedule prevented her from playing the role until it was screened on television in 1971.

She co-starred with Rachel Roberts in the Alan Bennett television play The Old Crowd (1979), directed by Lindsay Anderson.

Personal life
Bennett was the live-in companion of actor Godfrey Tearle in the late 1940s and early 1950s. She was married to screenwriter Willis Hall and later to John Osborne. Bennett and Osborne divorced, acrimoniously, in 1978. She had no children.

Death
Bennett died by suicide in October 1990, aged 58, having long suffered from depression and the brutalising effects of her marriage to Osborne (according to Osborne's biographer). She did this by taking an overdose of Quinalbarbitone Her death took place at home, 23, Gloucester Walk, Kensington, London W8, and she left an estate valued at 
£596,978.

Osborne, who was subject during her life to a restraining order regarding written comments about her, immediately wrote a vituperative chapter about her to be added to the second volume of his autobiography. The chapter, in which he rejoiced at her death, caused great controversy.

In 1992, Bennett's ashes, along with those of her friend, the actress Rachel Roberts (who also died by suicide, in 1980), were scattered by their friend Lindsay Anderson on the waters of the River Thames in London. Anderson, with several of the two actresses' professional colleagues and friends, took a boat trip down the Thames, and the ashes were scattered while musician Alan Price sang the song "Is That All There Is?" The event was included in Anderson's autobiographical BBC documentary Is That All There Is? (1992).

Filmography

Film

Television

Theatre career
 Shakespeare Memorial Theatre, Stratford upon Avon, 1949 season
 Titania in A Midsummer Night’s Dream, St Martin's Theatre, December 1949
 Anni in Captain Carvallo, St. James' Theatre, August 1950
 Iras in Caesar and Cleopatra and Antony and Cleopatra, St. James' Theatre, May 1951 (opposite Laurence Olivier and Vivien Leigh)
 Helen Eliot in The Night of the Ball, New Theatre, January 1955
 Masha in The Seagull, Saville Theatre, August 1956
 Mrs. Martin in The Bald Prima Donna, Arts Theatre, November 1956
 Sarah Stanham in The Touch of Fear, Aldwych Theatre, December 1956
 Isabelle in Dinner With the Family, New Theatre, December 1957
 Penelope in Last Day in Dreamland and A Glimpse of the Sea, Lyric Hammersmith, November 1959
  Susan Roper in Breakfast for One, Arts Theatre, April 1961
 Feemy Evans in The Showing Up of Blanco Posnet, and Lavinia in Androcles and the Lion, Mermaid Theatre, October 1961
 Estelle in In Camera (Huis Clos), Oxford Playhouse, February 1962
 Ophelia in Castle in Sweden, Piccadilly Theatre, May 1962
 Hilary in The Sponge Room, and Elizabeth Mintey in Squat Betty, Royal Court, December 1962
 Isabelle in The Love Game, New Arts Theatre, October 1964
 Countess Sophia Delyanoff in A Patriot for Me, Royal Court, June 1965
 Anna Bowers in A Lily in Little India, Hampstead Theatre Club, November 1965
 Imogen Parrott in Trelawney of the Wells, National Theatre at the Old Vic, August 1966
 Katerina in The Storm, National Theatre at the Old Vic, October 1966
 Pamela in Time Present, Royal Court, May 1968 at the Duke of York’s Theatre, July 1968 (for which she won the Variety Club and Evening Standard Awards for Best Actress)
 Anna Bowers in Three Months Gone at the Royal Court in January 1970; at the Duchess Theatre in March 1970,
 Frederica in West of Suez, Royal Court, August 1971; Cambridge Theatre, October 1971
Hedda in Hedda Gabler, Royal Court, June 1972
 Amanda in Private Lives (briefly taking over for Maggie Smith), Queen's Theatre, June 1973
 Leslie Crosbie in The Letter, Palace Theatre, Watford, July 1973
 Isobel Sands in The End of Me Old Cigar, Greenwich Theatre, January 1975
 Fay in Loot, Royal Court, June 1975
 Sally Prosser in Watch It Come Down, National Theatre at the Old Vic, February 1976 at the National Theatre at the Old Vic; March 1976 at the Lyttelton Theatre
 Mrs. Shankland and Miss Railton-Bell in Separate Tables, Apollo Theatre, January 1977
 Mrs. Tina in The Aspern Papers (1978); The Queen in The Eagle Has Two Heads (1979); and Maggie Cutler in The Man Who Came to Dinner (1979); all at the Chichester Festival Theatre
 Gertrude in Hamlet, Royal Court, April 1980
 Alice in The Dance of Death, Royal Exchange Manchester, October 1983
 Janine in Infidelities, at the Edinburgh Festival Fringe in August 1985; at the Donmar Warehouse in October 1985; and revived at the Boulevard Theatre in June 1986
 Queen Elizabeth I in Mary Stuart, Edinburgh Festival, August 1987
 Miss Singer in Exceptions, New End Theatre, Hampstead, July 1988
 Anne in Poor Nanny, King's Head Theatre, March 1989

Radio theatre
Nora in A Doll's House, BBC Third Programme 1959.  Directed by Frederick Bradnum.  Cast included Jack May and John Gabriel.

Masha in The Three Sisters/TRI SESTRY, BBC Home Service Radio 1965. Directed by John Tydeman. Cast included Paul Scofield, Ian McKellen, Lynn Redgrave and Wilfrid Lawson.

References

Theatre sources
 Who’s Who in the Theatre, 17th Edition, Vol. 1. (Gale Research, 1981.)
 25 Years of the English Stage Company at the Royal Court, Richard Findlater, ed. (Amber Lane Press, 1981.)
 Theatre Record (periodical indexes)

External links
 Performances in the Theatre Archive, University of Bristol

Oxford Dictionary of National Biography (includes photo)

Alumni of RADA
British film actresses
British stage actresses
1931 births
1990 suicides
Female suicides
People educated at Prior's Field School
Drug-related suicides in England
Suicides in Kensington
Barbiturates-related deaths
20th-century British actresses
People from Penang
British television actresses
1990 deaths